The Oos (OHS), also called the Oosbach, is a river of Baden-Württemberg, Germany. It starts in the Northern Black Forest, flows through Baden-Baden, and ends in the Murg in Rastatt.

See also
List of rivers of Baden-Württemberg

References

Rivers of Baden-Württemberg
Rivers of the Black Forest
Tributaries of the Murg (Northern Black Forest)
Baden-Baden
Rivers of Germany